Gabriel Francisco Lisette (2 April 1919 – 3 March 2001) was a Chadian politician who played a key role in the decolonization of Chad.

Biography 
Of African descent, he was born at Portobelo in Panama on 2 April 1919. He became a French colonial administrator, and in this role was posted to Chad in 1946. In November of the same year Lisette was elected as deputy to the French National Assembly. In February 1947 he founded the country's first African political party, the Chadian Progressive Party (PPT), a radical and nationalist organization calling for self-determination. It was a branch of the Marxist-oriented inter-territorial African Democratic Rally, of which he was to be later chosen as secretary-general. Women, like Kalthouma Nguembang, were important to the foundation of the party.

The PPT was not immediately successful, as it found itself boycotted by the French colonial administration and from the African traditional rulers, who preferred the more conservative Chadian Democratic Union (UDT). The situation radically changed with the French Overseas Reform Act of 1956 which greatly expanded the electoral suffrage. Also, the UDT was riven by splits and dissensions; as a result, Lisette triumphantly won the 1957 elections for the Territorial Assembly, taking with his allies 47 seats out of 65.

Following this victory Lisette became first on 14 May 1957, Vice-President, and then, on 26 July 1958, President of the Government Council. He kept this position until he was deserted by the African traditional rulers, who supported a motion of no confidence presented on 11 February  1959, behind which was Ahmed Koulamallah. Lisette was able to immediately throw-down the two succeeding governments led by Gontchomé Sahoulba and Koulamallah, but when the PPT had again to form the government he stepped down in favour of a native Chadian, the party's secretary-general François Tombalbaye, who became head of the government on 26 March. Lisette entered the government as deputy Prime Minister in charge of economic coordination and foreign affairs.

But Lisette's fall was nearing: a week before Chad became independent on 11 August 1960, Tombalbaye purged him from the PPT, declared him a noncitizen while he was traveling abroad, and barred him from returning to Chad. This event signed the end of Lisette's political career in Chad, and Lisette went in exile in France, where he had been named on 23 July 1959 "councillor minister" in the government guided by Michel Debré, a formal charge he would keep till 19 May 1961. In exile he continued to worry Tombalbaye as a possible menace for his regime, especially from 1971 when relations between France and Chad started cooling.

In 1976 he founded with Alain Girard a non-governmental organization, the Société mutuelle des originaires d'Outre-Mer (SMODOM), with in mind the mutual aid societies active in Europe in the 19th century. As those, its main finalities were to create a society whose members covered the expenses if one of them was ill or, if dead, could not afford a funeral.

He later wrote a book on the events to which he participated, Le Combat du Rassemblement démocratique African pour la décolonisation pacifique de l'Afrique noire.

He died at Port-de-Lanne, in France, on 3 March 2001.

References 

 Chad: A Country Study  
 1st page on the French National Assembly website

 2nd page on the French National Assembly website

External links 
  The decolonisation at Tchad Forum

1919 births
2001 deaths
People from Portobelo District
Union progressiste politicians
Democratic and Socialist Union of the Resistance politicians
Rassemblement Démocratique Africain politicians
Chadian Progressive Party politicians
Deputies of the 1st National Assembly of the French Fourth Republic
Deputies of the 3rd National Assembly of the French Fourth Republic
Deputies of the 1st National Assembly of the French Fifth Republic
François Tombalbaye
Chadian independence activists
Panamanian emigrants
Immigrants to France
French emigrants to Chad